Montserrat is a multi-peaked mountain range near Barcelona, in Catalonia, Spain. It is part of the Catalan Pre-Coastal Range. The main peaks are Sant Jeroni (1,236 m), Montgrós (1,120 m) and Miranda de les Agulles (903 m).

It is well known as the site of the Benedictine abbey, Santa Maria de Montserrat, which hosts the Virgin of Montserrat sanctuary.

"Montserrat" literally means "serrated (like the common handsaw) mountain" in Catalan. It describes its peculiar aspect with a multitude of rock formations that are visible from a great distance. The mountain is composed of strikingly pink conglomerate, a form of sedimentary rock. Montserrat was designated as a National Park in 1987. The Monastery of Montserrat which houses the virgin that gives its name to the monastery is also on the mountain, although it is also known as La Moreneta ("the little tan/dark one" in Catalan).

Access
The Benedictine Abbey can be reached by road, by the Aeri de Montserrat cable car, or by the Montserrat Rack Railway. The lower stations of both the rack railway and the cable car can be reached by Ferrocarrils de la Generalitat de Catalunya train from Barcelona's Plaça d'Espanya station. From the abbey, the Funicular de Sant Joan funicular railway goes up to the top of the mountain, where there are various abandoned hovels in the cliff faces that were previously the abodes of reclusive monks, while the Funicular de la Santa Cova descends to a shrine.

Hiking and climbing
It is accessible by hiking trails which connect from the top entrance to the Sant Joan funicular, the monastery, or the base of the mountain. Montserrat is part of the GR footpath 172. The Cavall Bernat  is an important rock feature popular with climbers.
 The well-known via ferrata Canal de las Damas (difficulty level D) leads from Collbató through a canal.

Geology

Montserrat is formed of conglomerate that was originally deposited in a fan delta at the margin of the Ebro Basin, part of the foreland basin to the Pyrenees, during the middle Eocene. The conglomerate was derived from the uplifting Catalan Coastal Ranges to the southeast of the basin and the clast type is dominated by Triassic sedimentary rocks. The fan had an original size of between 100 and 150 square kilometres. The resistance of the Montserrat conglomerate to erosion compared to the rest of the fill of the Ebro Basin explains its current mountainous nature.

The dominant clast lithology in the conglomerate is limestone and the sequence is cemented by calcite. The presence of so much carbonate in the rock has led to the formation of typical karst landforms, such as cave systems and karst towers.

Namesakes
In 1493, Christopher Columbus named the Caribbean island of Montserrat Santa Maria de Montserrate, after the Virgin of Montserrat. Again, in 1606, the Spanish expedition of Luis Vaéz de Torres charted Mount Ernest island in the Torres Strait as Santa Maria de Montserrate, due to its relatively high peak. Also Monserrate is a 3,152 m high mountain that dominates Bogotá's downtown which has a church built in 1650 over the ancient Muisca sacred mountain and that includes a funicular and an aerial lift similar to the ones at Montserrat.

References

External links

 
 LARSA Montserrat Montserrat General Information
Gallery of oblique aerial photos of Montserrat, by Doc Searls
Getting to Montserrat from Barcelona city

Mountains of Catalonia
Shrines to the Virgin Mary
Rock formations of Catalonia
Christian hermitages in Spain
Mountains associated with Christian monasticism